Beamys is a genus of rodent in the family Nesomyidae. 
It contains the following species:
 Lesser hamster-rat (Beamys hindei)
 Greater hamster-rat (Beamys major)

References

 
Rodent genera
Taxa named by Oldfield Thomas
Taxonomy articles created by Polbot